Johannes Brandrup (born 7 January 1967) is a German actor.

Career
Born in Frankfurt am Main, Brandrup was the first detective in the TV series Alarm für Cobra 11 – Die Autobahnpolizei. After the first season Brandrup moved on to other projects, but briefly returned for its 40th season.

Selected filmography

TV
Alarm für Cobra 11 – Die Autobahnpolizei (1996, 2016)
The Crusaders (2001)
Imperium: Saint Peter (2005)
Mafalda di Savoia: Il coraggio di una principessa (2006) as Philipp, Landgrave of Hesse 
Augustine: The Decline of the Roman Empire (2010)
Mary of Nazareth (2012)

Movies
Paul the Apostle (2005)
80 Minutes (2008)

External links
 
 Fanclub

Living people
1967 births
German male film actors
German male television actors
Actors from Frankfurt
People educated at Atlantic College